The Indices of deprivation 2004 (ID 2004) is a deprivation index at the small area level, created by the British Department for Communities and Local Government(DCLG).

It is unusual in its inclusion of a measure of geographical access as an element of deprivation and in its direct measure of poverty (through data on benefit receipts). The ID 2004 is based on the idea of distinct dimensions of deprivation which can be recognised and measured separately. These are then combined into a single overall measure. The Index is made up of seven distinct dimensions of deprivation called Domain Indices. Whilst it is known as the ID2004, most of the data actually dates from 2001.

History
Communities and Local Government (previously the Office of Deputy Prime Minister) commissioned the Social Disadvantage Research Centre (SDRC) at the Department of Social Policy and Social Work at the University of Oxford to update the Indices of  deprivation 2004 (ID 2004) for England. Following an extensive public consultation (see Annex A), an independent academic peer review and a significant programme of work, the new Indices of Deprivation 2007 were produced in December 2007.

The new Index of Multiple Deprivation 2007 (IMD 2007) is a Lower layer Super Output Area (LSOA) level measure of multiple deprivation, and is made up of seven LSOA level domain indices. There are also two supplementary indices (Income Deprivation Affecting Children and Income Deprivation Affecting Older People). Summary measures of the IMD 2007 are presented at local authority district level and county council level. The LSOA level Domain Indices and IMD 2007, together with the local authority district and county summaries are referred to as the Indices of Deprivation 2007 (ID 2007).(Rusty 2009)

The ID 2007 are based on the approach, structure and methodology that were used to create the previous ID 2004. The ID 2007 updates the ID 2004 using more up-to-date data. The new IMD 2007 contains seven domains which relate to income deprivation, employment deprivation, health deprivation and disability, education skills and training deprivation, barriers to housing and services, living environment deprivation, and crime.

Domain Indices

Income

The purpose of this Domain is to capture the proportions of the population experiencing income deprivation in an area. 
Employment

This Domain measures employment deprivation by considering people of working age who are involuntarily excluded from the world of work, either through unemployment. ill health or family circumstances. 

Health and disability

This Domain identifies areas with relatively high rates of people who die prematurely or whose quality of life is impaired by poor health or who are disabled, across the whole population. 

Education, skills and training

The purpose of the Domain is to capture the extent of deprivation in education, skills and training in a local area. The indicators fall into two sub-domains: one relating to lack of attainment among children and young people and one relating to lack of qualifications in terms of skills. These two sub-domains are designed to reflect the ‘flow’ and ‘stock’ of educational disadvantage within an area respectively. That is, the children/young people sub-domain measures the deprivation in the attaining of qualifications, while the skills sub-domain measures the deprivation in the resident working age adult population. 

Barriers to Housing and Services

The purpose of this Domain is to measure barriers to housing and key local services. The indicators fall into two sub-domains: ‘geographical barriers’ and ‘wider barriers’ which includes issues relating to access to housing such as affordability. 

Living environment

This Domain focuses on deprivation in the living environment. It comprises two sub-domains: the ‘indoors’ living environment which measures the quality of housing and the ‘outdoors’ living environment which contains two measures about air quality and road traffic accidents. 

Crime

This Domain measures the rate of recorded crime for four major crime themes – burglary, theft, criminal damage and violence - representing the occurrence of personal and material victimisation at a small area level.

Each Domain contains a number of indicators, totalling 37. Two supplementary indexes have been created as a subset of the Income domain. These relate to income deprivation affecting children and income deprivation affecting older people.

Geography

The Indices of deprivation 2004 are measured at the Lower Layer Super Output Area level. Super Output Areas were developed by the Office for National Statistics (ONS) from the Census 2001 Output Areas. There are two levels, the lowest (which the Index is based upon) being smaller than wards and containing a minimum of 1,000 people and 400 households. The middle layer contains a minimum of 5,000 people and 2,000 households. Earlier proposals to introduce Upper Layer Super Output Areas were dropped due to lack of demand. 

In addition to Super Output Areas, Summaries of the ID 2004 are presented at District level, County level and Primary Care Trust (PCT) level.

While each SOA is of higher resolution than the highest resolution ward index data of the IMD2000 and therefore better at identifying "pockets" of deprivation within wards the 2004 system has its problems. Some areas of deprivation can still be hidden because of the size of SOAs. Examples of this can be found by comparing central areas of Keighley using the Bradford District Deprivation Index (a Deprivation index developed by Bradford Council produced at 1991 Census Enumeration District level) with the ID2004.
Additionally SOAs were tasked with providing complete coverage of England and Wales - this combined with the minimum population and household counts within each SOA means that large areas of agricultural, commercial and industrial land have to be included within a residential area that borders them - thus when some very deprived residential areas are mapped, a large area of supposed deprivation emerges, however most of it may not be so but rather has a wide area of relative affluence around it - these can appear to be a greater problem than many smaller completely residential SOAs in which higher concentrations of deprived people live but mixed with more affluent neighbours.

References
 Indices of deprivation 2007
 Indices of deprivation 2004
 Indices of Multiple Deprivation 2000 AKA Indices of Deprivation 2000
 Bradford District Deprivation Index

Public health in the United Kingdom
Medical data sets
Geography of England
Measurements and definitions of poverty
Social statistics data
Poverty in England